The Bookshop is a 2017 drama film written and directed by Isabel Coixet, based on the 1978 novel of the same name by Penelope Fitzgerald, in which the lead character attempts against opposition to open a bookshop in the coastal town of Hardborough, Suffolk (a thinly-disguised version of Southwold). Shooting took place in Portaferry and Strangford, County Down, Northern Ireland  and in Barcelona during August and September 2016.

The film stars Emily Mortimer, Patricia Clarkson and Bill Nighy. It won three Goya Awards, including Best Film, Best Director, and Best Adapted Screenplay.

Plot
Set in the late 1950s, the film opens with an explanatory voice-over narration. Florence Green, a widow, has decided to open a bookshop in the small coastal town of Hardborough, Suffolk, acquiring as her premises the Old House, a damp and abandoned property that has been standing empty for many years.

After refurbishing it and moving in, she learns that Violet Gamart, an influential and ambitious local resident, had privately earmarked the Old House for her own pet project, a local arts centrea project that she has no intention of dropping even though the property is no longer empty. Aided by several of the townspeople Mrs Gamart attempts to get Florence evicted, and the shop closed.

Florence's business does well enough for her to need help in the shop from Christine, the young daughter of a neighbour. Christine is very effective, even though she says that she does not much like reading. Their best customer is the wealthy bookish recluse Edmund Brundish, who begins to have feelings for Florence as she introduces him to new authors, especially Ray Bradbury. Learning of the threats to Florence's business, he emerges from his seclusion, visits Mrs Gamart, and adamantly tells her to desist. The effort involved in doing so is too much for him, and he collapses and dies.

Mrs Gamart's nephew, a member of Parliament, sponsors a bill that empowers local councils to buy any historic building that has been left unused for five years. The bill is passed, the Old House is compulsorily purchased, and Florence is evicted without compensation. Defeated, she departs from the town by ferry, and is waved off from the quayside by Christine. As the boat draws away she realises that Christine has set the Old House alight with a paraffin heater.

The scene switches to the present day and it becomes clear that the narrator is the adult Christine, who now runs her own bookshop.

Cast

Release
La librería, the Spanish version of The Bookshop, premiered at the inauguration gala of the 2017 edition of SEMINCI, Valladolid, with excellent reviews. The Spanish release took place on 10 November, with unanimous positive reviews and grossed close to US$3.5 million during its run of more than fifteen weeks in Spanish theatres.

On 18 December 2017 Variety announced a Berlinale Special Gala with The Bookshop in February 2018, during the 68th Berlin International Film Festival.

Reception

Critical reception
On review aggregator website Rotten Tomatoes, the film holds an approval rating of 56% based on 108 reviews, and an average rating of 5.5/10. The website's critical consensus reads: "A rare adaptation that sticks too closely to its source material, The Bookshops meticulously crafted world building gets lost in its meandering pace". On Metacritic, the film has a weighted average score of 62 out of 100, based on 22 critics, indicating "generally favorable reviews".

Awards and nominations
Isabel Coixet's screenplay won the Frankfurt Book Fair prize for Best International Literary Adaptation 2017.

On 13 December 2017, The Bookshop received 12 nominations for the XXXIIIrd edition of the Goya Awards, by the Spanish Cinema Academy. On 3 February 2018, it won three major Goya Awards: Best Film, Best Director, and Best Adapted Screenplay.

On 28 December 2017, the film won 12 nominations for the Xth edition of the Gaudí Awards, including Best Non-Catalan Speaking Film, Best Direction, and Best Screenplay. On 28 January 2018, it won two Gaudí Awards for Best Artistic Direction and Best Original Score.

On 13 March 2018, the film won 4 nominations for the 5th edition of the Platino Awards including Best Film, Best Direction, Best Screenplay, and Best Original Music.

References

External links
 
 
 

2017 films
2017 drama films
Best Film Goya Award winners
British drama films
English-language German films
English-language Spanish films
Films set in bookstores
Films about businesspeople
Films based on British novels
Films directed by Isabel Coixet
Films set in Suffolk
Films set in the 1950s
Films shot in Northern Ireland
Films shot in Barcelona
German drama films
Spanish drama films
Vertigo Films films
2010s English-language films
2010s British films
2010s Spanish films
2010s German films